The coat of arms of Ulcinj has the shape of a shield on which are assembled some of the main characteristic of Ulcinj, the stone Castle on the sea shore, the symbol of Sun set on the Castle, olive branches with fruits and antique Liburnian ship with wolf head at the deck returned on the boat.

References

Ulcinj
Ulcinj
ulcinj
ulcinj
ulcinj
ulcinj